In a reciprocating piston engine, the stroke ratio, defined by either bore/stroke ratio or stroke/bore ratio, is a term to describe the ratio between cylinder bore diameter and piston stroke length.  This can be used for either an internal combustion engine, where the fuel is burned within the cylinders of the engine, or external combustion engine, such as a steam engine, where the combustion of the fuel takes place outside the working cylinders of the engine.

A fairly comprehensive yet understandable study of stroke/bore effects was published in Horseless Age, 1916.

Conventions
In a piston engine, there are two different ways of describing the stroke ratio of its cylinders, namely: bore/stroke ratio, and stroke/bore ratio.

Bore/stroke ratio
Bore/stroke is the more commonly used term, with usage in North America, Europe, United Kingdom, Asia, and Australia.

The diameter of the cylinder bore is divided by the length of the piston stroke to give the ratio.

Square, oversquare and undersquare engines
The following terms describe the naming conventions for the configurations of the various bore/stroke ratio:

Square engine
A square engine has equal bore and stroke dimensions, giving a bore/stroke value of exactly 1:1.

Square engine examples

1953 – Ferrari 250 Europa had Lampredi V12 with  bore and stroke.

1967 – FIAT 125, 124Sport engine 125A000-90 hp, 125B000-100 hp, 125BC000-110 hp, 1608 ccm, DOHC,  bore and stroke.

1970 – Ford 400 had a  bore and stroke.

1973 – Kawasaki Z1 and KZ(Z)900 had a  bore and stroke.

1973 – British Leyland's Australian division created a 4.4-litre version of the Rover V8 engine, with bore and stroke both measuring 88.9 mm.  This engine was exclusively used in the Leyland P76.

1982 - Honda Nighthawk 250 and Honda CMX250C Rebel have a  bore and stroke, making it a square engine.

1983 – Mazda FE 2.0L inline four-cylinder engine with a perfectly squared  bore and stroke. This engine also features the ideal 1.75:1 rod/stroke ratio.

1987 – The Opel/Vauxhall 2.0 L GM Family II engines are square at  bore and stroke; example as C20XE C20NE C20LET X20A X20XEV X20XER Z20LET Z20LEH Z20LER A20NHT A20NFT.

1989 – Nissan's SR20DE is a square engine, with an  bore and stroke.

1990 – Maserati Shamal had  biturbo V8 engine AM 479 with  bore and stroke. This engine, after modifications, was later installed in Quattroporte IV and 3200 GT.

1990–2010 Saab B234/B235 is a square engine, with a  bore and stroke.

1991 – Ford's 4.6 V8 OHC engine has a  bore and stroke. It has been the backbone of Ford V8-powered cars and trucks in different power levels and head designs for two decades.

1995 – The BMW M52 engine with a displacement of 2793 cubic centimeters is an example of a perfect square engine with an  bore and stroke.

1996 – Jaguar's AJ-V8 engine in 4.0-litre form has an 86.0 mm bore and stroke.

2000 – Mercedes-Benz 4.0-litre OM628 V8 diesel engine is an example of a square engine – with an  bore and stroke.

The Volkswagen Group's 2005 W16 engine as used in the Bugatti Veyron also using a  bore and stroke.

The Peugeot XU10 engine line – with a displacement of 1998 cubic centimeters – is an example of a perfect square engine with an  bore and stroke.

Toyota's 2JZ and 4U are square engines, with  bore and stroke.

Toyota's 2TR-FE is a square engines, with  bore and stroke.

Toyota 1G is a square engine with an  bore and stroke.

Honda's J30A engine has an  bore and stroke.

Suzuki AX100 engine has a  bore and stroke.

Yamaha YBR125 engine has a  bore and stroke.

Oversquare or short-stroke engine
An engine is described as oversquare or short-stroke if its cylinders have a greater bore diameter than its stroke length, giving a bore/stroke ratio greater than 1:1.

An oversquare engine allows for more and larger valves in the head of the cylinder, higher possible rpm by lowering maximum piston speed, and lower crank stress due to the lower peak piston acceleration for the same engine (rotational) speed. Because these characteristics favor higher engine speeds, oversquare engines are often tuned to develop peak torque at a relatively high speed.

Due to the increased piston and head surface area, the heat loss increases as the bore/stroke ratio is increased. Thus an excessively high ratio can lead to a decreased thermal efficiency compared to other engine geometries.  The large size/width of the combustion chamber at ignition can cause increased inhomogeneity in the air/fuel mixture during combustion, resulting in higher emissions.

The reduced stroke length allows for a shorter cylinder and sometimes a shorter connecting rod, generally making oversquare engines less tall  but wider than undersquare engines of similar engine displacement.

Oversquare engine examples
Oversquare engines (a.k.a. "short stroke engines") are very common, as they allow higher rpm (and thus more power), without excessive piston speed.

Examples include both Chevrolet and Ford small-block V8s; the GMC 478 V6 has a bore/stroke ratio of 1.33. The 1.6 litre version of the BMW N45 gasoline engine has a bore/stroke ratio of 1.167.

Horizontally opposed, also known as "Boxer" or "flat", engines typically feature oversquare designs since any increase in stroke length would result in twice the increase in overall engine width.  This is particularly so in Subaru’s front-engine layout, where the steering angle of the front wheels is constrained by the width of the engine. The Subaru EJ181 engine develops peak torque at speeds as low as 3200 rpm.

Nissan's RB, VQ, VK, VH and VR38DETT engines are all oversquare. Additionally, SR16VE engine found in Nissan Pulsar VZ-R and VZ-R N1 is an oversquare engine with  bore and  stroke, giving it  but relatively small torque of 

Extreme oversquare engines are found in Formula One racing cars, where strict rules limit displacement, thereby necessitating that power be achieved through high engine speeds. Stroke ratios approaching 2.5:1 are allowed, enabling engine speeds of 18,000 rpm while remaining reliable for multiple races.

The Ducati Panigale motorcycle engine is extremely oversquare with a bore/stroke ratio of 1.84:1. It was given the name "SuperQuadro" by Ducati, roughly translated as "super-square" from Italian.

The side-valve Belgian D-Motor LF26 aero-engine has a bore/stroke ratio of 1.4:1.

Early Mercedes-Benz M116 engines had a  bore and a  stroke for a 3.5 litre V8.

Undersquare or long-stroke engine
An engine is described as undersquare or long-stroke if its cylinders have a smaller bore (width, diameter) than its stroke (length of piston travel)  - giving a ratio value of less than 1:1.

At a given engine speed, a longer stroke increases engine friction and increases stress on the crankshaft due to the higher peak piston acceleration. The smaller bore also reduces the area available for valves in the cylinder head, requiring them to be smaller or fewer in number.

Undersquare engines often exhibit peak torque at lower rpm than an oversquare engine due to their smaller valves and high piston speed limiting their potential to rev higher.

Undersquare engines have become more common lately, as manufacturers push for more and more efficient engines and higher fuel economy.

Undersquare engine examples
Many inline engines, particularly those mounted transversely in front-wheel-drive cars, utilize an undersquare design. The smaller bore allows for a shorter engine that increases room available for the front wheels to steer. Examples of this include many Volkswagen, Nissan, Honda, and Mazda engines. The 1KR-FE-engine used in the Toyota Aygo, Citroën C1 and Peugeot 107 amongst others is an example of a modern long-stroke engine widely used in FF layout cars. This engine has a bore and stroke of  stroke giving it a bore/stroke ratio of 0.845:1. Some rear-wheel-drive cars that borrow engines from front-wheel-drive cars (such as the Mazda MX-5) use an undersquare design.

BMW's acclaimed S54B32 engine was undersquare with a bore and stroke of ), offering a world record torque-per-litre figure for normally-aspirated production engines at the time; this record stood until Ferrari unveiled the 458 Italia.

Many British automobile companies used undersquare designs until the 1950s, largely because of a motor tax system that taxed cars by their cylinder bore.  This includes the BMC A-Series engine, and many Nissan derivatives. The Trojan Car used an undersquare, split piston, two stroke, two-cylinder inline engine; this was partly for this tax advantage and partly because its proportions allowed flexing V-shaped connecting rods for the two pistons of each U-shaped cylinder, which was cheaper and simpler than two connecting rods joined with an additional bearing.

Their French and German competitors at the time also used undersquare designs even in absence of the tax reasoning, e. g. Renault Billancourt engine and Opel straight-6 engine.

The 225 cu in (3.7 litre) Chrysler Slant-6 engine is undersquare, with a bore and stroke of  stroke (bore/stroke ratio = 0.819:1).

Since the stroke is significantly longer than the bore, the SOHC 16V (2-valve per cylinder) version of this engine is able to generate a peak torque of 350 lb·ft as low as 2501 rpm.

The Willys Jeep  L134 and F134 engines were undersquare, with a bore and stroke of  stroke (bore/stroke ratio = 0.714:1).

The 4-litre Barra Inline 6 engine from the Australian Ford Falcon, uses a bore and stroke of  stroke, which equates to a 0.929:1 bore-stroke ratio.

The Jaguar XK6 engine, used in all 6-cylinder Jaguars from 1949 to 1987 was undersquare.

Virtually all piston engines used in military aircraft were long-stroke engines. The PW R-2800, Wright R-3350, Pratt & Whitney R-4360 Wasp Major, Rolls-Royce Merlin (1650), Allison V-1710, and Hispano-Suiza 12Y-Z are only a few of more than a hundred examples.

All diesel-powered ships have massively undersquare marine engines, usually using crossheads.

While most modern motorcycle engines are square or oversquare, some are undersquare.  The Kawasaki Z1300's straight-six engine was made undersquare to minimise engine width, more recently, a new straight-twin engine for the Honda NC700 series used an undersquare design to achieve better combustion efficiency in order to reduce fuel consumption.

Notes

References 

Engine technology
Piston engines
Engineering ratios